Admiral of the Fleet Sir William Doveton Minet Staveley  (10 November 1928 – 13 October 1997) was a Royal Navy officer. Staveley saw service as a minesweeper commander on coastal patrol during the Indonesia–Malaysia confrontation before commanding a frigate and then an aircraft carrier and ultimately achieving higher command in the Navy. He served as First Sea Lord and Chief of Naval Staff in the late 1980s. In that role he fought hard for a fleet large enough to meet NATO commitments.

Early life
Born the son of Admiral Cecil Staveley and Margaret Adela (née Sturdee), Staveley was educated at West Downs School, Winchester and the Royal Naval College, Dartmouth. He was a grandson of Admiral of the Fleet Sir Doveton Sturdee, a naval commander in the First World War.

Naval career

He joined the Royal Navy as a cadet in 1942. Promoted to midshipman on 1 September 1946, he was posted to the cruiser HMS Ajax and then the destroyer HMS Zephyr. He was promoted to sub-lieutenant on 1 January 1948 and then served in the cruisers HMS Nigeria and HMS Bermuda. Promoted to lieutenant on 1 September 1950, he became Flag Lieutenant to the Commander-in-Chief Home Fleet in 1952, an instructor at the Royal Naval College, Dartmouth in 1954 and then served in HM Yacht Britannia from 1957. He served on the destroyer HMS Cavalier from November 1957, and having been promoted to lieutenant commander on 1 September 1958, he was present at the hydrogen bomb tests on Kiritimati.

Staveley attended the Royal Naval Staff College at Greenwich in 1959 and then joined the staff of the Commander-in-Chief, The Nore. Promoted to commander on 31 December 1961, he was given command of the minesweeper HMS Houghton in January 1962 and saw service on coastal patrol during the Indonesia–Malaysia confrontation later that year. After a tour as Commander, Sea Training from 1964, he was given command of the frigate HMS Zulu in October 1967 and promoted to captain on appointment as Assistant Director of Naval Plans at the Ministry of Defence on 31 December 1967. He went on to command the amphibious warfare ship HMS Intrepid as Flag Captain to the Second-in-Command of the Far East Fleet in November 1970 and was given command of the aircraft carrier HMS Albion in May 1972. He attended the Royal College of Defence Studies in 1973 and became Director of Naval Plans at the Ministry of Defence in February 1974 and the Flag Officer, Second Flotilla in October 1976. He was promoted to rear admiral on 7 January 1977 and became Flag Officer, Carriers & Amphibious Ships and NATO Commander, Carrier Striking Group Two in March 1977. He went on to be Chief of Staff to the Commander-in-Chief Fleet in October 1978 and, having been promoted to vice admiral on 11 April 1980, he became Vice Chief of the Naval Staff in July 1980. He was appointed a Knight Commander of the Order of the Bath in 1981 Birthday Honours.

Staveley was promoted to full admiral on 29 October 1982 on appointment as Commander-in-Chief Fleet and NATO Commander-in-Chief, Channel and Commander-in-Chief Eastern Atlantic. Advanced to Knight Grand Cross of the Order of the Bath in the 1984 Birthday Honours, he became First Sea Lord and Chief of the Naval Staff on 2 August 1985. In that role he fought hard for a fleet large enough to meet NATO commitments. He was promoted to Admiral of the Fleet on his retirement in May 1989.

Later career
In retirement Staveley became Chairman of the Royal London Hospital and Associated Community Services NHS Trust, Chairman of the British School of Osteopathy and Chairman of the North East Thames Regional Health Authority as well as Chairman of the Chatham Historic Dockyard. He also became President of the Kent Branch of the Royal British Legion, vice-president of the Falkland Islands Association, a Member of the Court of the University of Kent and a governor of Sutton Valence School. He was also a Freeman of the City of London, a Liveryman of the Shipwrights' Company and a younger brother of Trinity House.

Staveley became a Deputy Lieutenant of Kent on 14 February 1992. He died of a heart attack at Sevenoaks in Kent on 13 October 1997.

Family
In 1954 Staveley married Bettina Kirstine Shuter; they had a son and a daughter.

References

Sources
 

|-

|-

Graduates of the Royal College of Defence Studies
Graduates of the Royal Naval College, Greenwich
Knights Grand Cross of the Order of the Bath
Deputy Lieutenants of Kent
Royal Navy admirals of the fleet
Royal Navy officers of World War II
First Sea Lords and Chiefs of the Naval Staff
People educated at West Downs School
Graduates of Britannia Royal Naval College
People associated with the University of Kent
1928 births
1997 deaths
Members of Trinity House